Jablanica is a village in the municipality of Bujanovac, Serbia. According to the 2002 census, the town has a population of 109 people.

Notable people 
Ajet Sopi Bllata, Albanian rebel

References

Populated places in Pčinja District